The acorn, or oaknut, is the nut of the oaks and their close relatives (genera Quercus and Lithocarpus, in the family Fagaceae). It usually contains one seed (occasionally 
two seeds), enclosed in a tough, leathery shell, and borne in a cup-shaped cupule. Acorns take between 5 and 24 months (depending on the species) to mature; see the list of Quercus species for details of oak classification, in which acorn morphology and phenology are important factors.

Etymology
The word acorn (earlier akerne, and acharn) is related to the Gothic name akran, which had the sense of "fruit of the unenclosed land". The word was applied to the most important forest produce, that of the oak. Chaucer spoke of "achornes of okes" in the 14th century. By degrees, popular etymology connected the word both with "corn" and "oak-horn", and the spelling changed accordingly. The current spelling (emerged 15c.-16c.), derives from association with ac (Old English: "oak") + corn.

Ecological role
Acorns play an important role in forest ecology when oaks are the dominant species or are plentiful. The volume of the acorn crop may vary widely, creating great abundance or great stress on the many animals dependent on acorns and the predators of those animals. Acorns, along with other nuts, are termed mast.

Wildlife that consume acorns as an important part of their diets include birds, such as jays, pigeons, some ducks, and several species of woodpeckers. Small mammals that feed on acorns include mice, squirrels and several other rodents. Acorns have a large influence on small rodents in their habitats, as large acorn yields help rodent populations to grow.

Large mammals such as pigs, bears, and deer also consume large amounts of acorns; they may constitute up to 25% of the diet of deer in the autumn. In Spain, Portugal and the New Forest region of southern England, pigs are still turned loose in dehesas (large oak groves) in the autumn, to fill and fatten themselves on acorns. Heavy consumption of acorns can, on the other hand, be toxic to other animals that cannot detoxify their tannins, such as horses and cattle.

The larvae of some moths and weevils also live in young acorns, consuming the kernels as they develop.

Acorns are attractive to animals because they are large and thus efficiently consumed or cached. Acorns are also rich in nutrients. Percentages vary from species to species, but all acorns contain large amounts of protein, carbohydrates and fats, as well as the minerals calcium, phosphorus and potassium, and the vitamin niacin. Total food energy in an acorn also varies by species, but all compare well with other wild foods and with other nuts.

Acorns also contain bitter tannins, the amount varying with the species. Since tannins, which are plant polyphenols, interfere with an animal's ability to metabolize protein, creatures must adapt in different ways to use the nutritional value acorns contain. Animals may preferentially select acorns that contain fewer tannins. When the tannins are metabolized in cattle, the tannic acid produced can cause ulceration and kidney failure.

Animals that cache acorns, such as jays and squirrels, may wait to consume some of these acorns until sufficient groundwater has percolated through them to leach out the tannins. Other animals buffer their acorn diet with other foods. Many insects, birds, and mammals metabolize tannins with fewer ill effects than do humans.

Species of acorn that contain large amounts of tannins are very bitter, astringent, and potentially irritating if eaten raw. This is particularly true of the acorns of American red oaks and English oaks. The acorns of white oaks, being much lower in tannins, are nutty in flavor; this characteristic is enhanced if the acorns are given a light roast before grinding.

Tannins can be removed by soaking chopped acorns in several changes of water, until the water no longer turns brown. Cold water leaching can take several days, but three to four changes of boiling water can leach the tannins in under an hour. Hot water leaching (boiling) cooks the starch of the acorn, which would otherwise act like gluten in flour, helping it bind to itself. For this reason, if the acorns will be used to make flour, then cold water leaching is preferred.

Being rich in fat, acorn flour can spoil or molder easily and must be carefully stored. Acorns are also sometimes prepared as a massage oil.

Acorns of the white oak group, Leucobalanus, typically start rooting as soon as they are in contact with the soil (in the fall), then send up the leaf shoot in the spring.

Dispersal agents

Acorns are too heavy for wind dispersal, so they require other ways to spread.

Many animals eat unripe acorns on the tree or ripe acorns from the ground, with no reproductive benefit to the oak, but some animals, such as squirrels and jays serve as seed dispersal agents. Jays and squirrels that scatter-hoard acorns in caches for future use effectively plant acorns in a variety of locations in which it is possible for them to germinate and thrive.

Even though jays and squirrels retain remarkably large mental maps of cache locations and return to consume them, the odd acorn may be lost, or a jay or squirrel may die before consuming all of its stores. A small number of acorns manage to germinate and survive, producing the next generation of oaks.

Scatter-hoarding behavior depends on jays and squirrels associating with plants that provide good packets of food that are nutritionally valuable, but not too big for the dispersal agent to handle. The beak sizes of jays determine how large acorns may get before jays ignore them.

Acorns germinate on different schedules, depending on their place in the oak family. Once acorns sprout, they are less nutritious, as the seed tissue converts to the indigestible lignins that form the root.

Uses
In some cultures, acorns once constituted a dietary staple, though they have largely been replaced by grains and are now typically considered a relatively unimportant food, except in some Native American and Korean communities.

Several cultures have devised traditional acorn-leaching methods, sometimes involving specialized tools, that were traditionally passed on to their children by word of mouth.

Culinary use

Acorns served an important role in early human history and were a source of food for many cultures around the world. For instance, the Ancient Greek lower classes and the Japanese (during the Jōmon period) would eat acorns, especially in times of famine. In ancient Iberia they were a staple food, according to Strabo. Despite this history, acorns rarely form a large part of modern diets and are not currently cultivated on scales approaching that of many other nuts. However, if properly prepared (by selecting high-quality specimens and leaching out the bitter tannins in water), acorn meal can be used in some recipes calling for grain flours. In antiquity, Pliny the Elder noted that acorn flour could be used to make bread. Varieties of oak differ in the amount of tannin in their acorns. Varieties preferred by Native Americans such as Quercus kelloggii (California black oak) may be easier to prepare or more palatable.

In Korea, an edible jelly named dotorimuk is made from acorns, and dotori guksu are Korean noodles made from acorn flour or starch. In the 17th century, a juice extracted from acorns was administered to habitual drunkards to cure them of their condition or else to give them the strength to resist another bout of drinking.

Acorns have frequently been used as a coffee substitute, particularly when coffee was unavailable or rationed. The Confederates in the American Civil War and Germans during World War II (when it was called Ersatz coffee), which were cut off from coffee supplies by Union and Allied blockades respectively, are particularly notable past instances of this use of acorns.

Use by Native Americans

Acorns are a traditional food of many indigenous peoples of North America, and long served an especially important role for Californian Native Americans, where the ranges of several species of oaks overlap, increasing the reliability of the resource. One ecology researcher of Yurok and Karuk heritage reports that "his traditional acorn preparation is a simple soup, cooked with hot stones directly in a basket," and says he enjoys acorns eaten with "grilled salmon, huckleberries or seaweed."
Unlike many other plant foods, acorns do not need to be eaten or processed right away, but may be stored for a long time, much as squirrels do. In years that oaks produced many acorns, Native Americans sometimes collected enough acorns to store for two years as insurance against poor acorn production years.

After drying in the sun to discourage mould and germination, acorns could be cached in hollow trees or structures on poles to keep them safe from mice and squirrels. Stored acorns could then be used when needed, particularly during the winter when other resources were scarce. Acorns that germinated in the fall were shelled and pulverized before those germinating in spring.  Because of their high fat content, stored acorns can become rancid. Moulds may also grow on them.

The lighting of ground fires killed the larvae of acorn moths and acorn weevils by burning them during their dormancy period in the soil.  The pests can infest and consume more than 95% of an oak's acorns. 

Fires also released the nutrients bound in dead leaves and other plant debris into the soil, thus fertilizing oak trees while clearing the ground to make acorn collection easier. Most North American oaks tolerate light fires, especially when consistent burning has eliminated woody fuel accumulation around their trunks. Consistent burning encouraged oak growth at the expense of other trees less tolerant of fire, thus keeping oaks dominant in the landscapes. 

Oaks produce more acorns when they are not too close to other oaks and thus competing with them for sunlight, water and soil nutrients. The fires tended to eliminate the more vulnerable young oaks and leave old oaks which created open oak savannas with trees ideally spaced to maximize acorn production.

In culture

Art
A motif in Roman architecture, also popular in Celtic and Scandinavian art, the acorn symbol is used as an ornament on cutlery, furniture, and jewelry; it also appears on finials at Westminster Abbey.

In the Artemis Fowl book series, "The Ritual" describes the method used by faeries to regenerate their magical powers.

Military symbolism

The acorn was used frequently by both Union and Confederate forces during the American Civil War.  Modern US Army Cavalry Scout campaign hats still retain traces of the acorn today.

Contemporary use as symbol
The acorn is the symbol for the National Trails of England and Wales, and is used for the waymarks on these paths. The acorn, specifically that of the white oak, is also present in the symbol for the University of Connecticut.

Acorns are also used as charges in heraldry.

See also
 Knopper gall

References

Quercus
Edible nuts and seeds
Ornaments
Plants used in Native American cuisine
Pre-Columbian Native American cuisine
Post-Columbian Native American cuisine
Heraldic charges